Daniel Ponce de León (born July 27, 1980) is a Mexican former professional boxer who competed from 2001 to 2014. He was a world champion in two weight classes, having held the WBO super bantamweight title from 2005 and 2008, and the WBC featherweight title from 2012 to 2013. As an amateur, de León won a bronze medal in the flyweight division at the 1999 Pan American Games, and was a member of the 2000 Mexican Olympic team in the featherweight division.

Early life
Daniel is a Tarahumara Amerindian, raised in the Sierra Madre Occidental mountain range. Out of five brothers he was the only one to survive, due to the harsh conditions in his tribal area, the Sierra Madre.

Amateur career
Daniel was a Mexican National Amateur champion and a bronze medalist at the 1999 Pan American Games. Ponce de León would then go onto represent Mexico at the 2000 Summer Olympics.

WBO junior featherweight champion
On October 29, 2005 he defeated Sod Kokietgym by unanimous decision, handing Looknongyangtoy his first career loss. He has defended his WBO junior featherweight title eight times against Gerson Guerrero, Reynaldo Lopez, Sod Kokietgym twice, Al Seeger, Gerry Peñalosa, Rey Bautista and Eduardo Escobedo. Ponce de León's first loss was a unanimous decision loss to Celestino Caballero on February 17, 2005.

Ponce de León retained his title against Eduardo Escobedo on December 8, 2007 via unanimous decision, as part of the undercard of the Floyd Mayweather Jr.–Ricky Hatton fight. On June 7, 2008 Ponce de León was defeated by technical knockout in the first round by Juan Manuel López, losing his WBO Super Bantamweight title.

De León was the headliner of a sold out Golden Boy show and inched closer to another world title shot by knocking out Puerto Rican, Orlando Cruz. Daniel defeated Cornelius Lock on May 1, 2010 the undercard of Floyd Mayweather vs. Shane Mosley in the MGM Grand Garden Arena on HBO PPV to retain his WBC Latino featherweight title.

Super featherweight contention
On March 5, 2011, De Leon moved up to the super featherweight division to face undefeated prospect Adrien Broner. The fight was expected to be a showcase bout for the younger and larger Broner, however, De Leon proved to be more competitive than anticipated as Broner was awarded a highly disputed ten round unanimous decision.

WBC featherweight champion
In an upset, Ponce de Leon emerged victorious over WBC featherweight champion Jhonny Gonzalez, coming away with an eighth-round unanimous technical decision victory before a sold-out crowd at Saturday night's Showtime-televised event at the MGM Grand.

The bout ended when a nasty gash emerged over the right eye of Gonzalez (52–8, 45 KOs), of Mexico City, after which it was determined that Gonzalez could not continue, they went to the scorecards and he won via: 79–72, 79–72, 77–74, all for Ponce de Leon. Ponce de Leon fought Abner Mares in the Mayweather-Guerrero undercard on May 4, 2013 and got knocked down in the second and ninth rounds en route to a TKO loss at 2:20 of the ninth round, losing his WBC featherweight title in the process.

Professional boxing record

Exhibition boxing record

See also
List of super bantamweight boxing champions
List of featherweight boxing champions
List of WBO world champions
List of WBC world champions
List of Mexican boxing world champions

References

External links

1980 births
Boxers at the 1999 Pan American Games
Boxers at the 2000 Summer Olympics
Indigenous Mexicans
Living people
Boxers from Chihuahua (state)
Olympic boxers of Mexico
Southpaw boxers
World Boxing Organization champions
American male boxers
Pan American Games bronze medalists for Mexico
Flyweight boxers
Bantamweight boxers
Super-featherweight boxers
World Boxing Council champions
Pan American Games medalists in boxing
Indigenous sportspeople of the Americas
World super-bantamweight boxing champions
World featherweight boxing champions
People from Ciudad Cuauhtémoc, Chihuahua
Medalists at the 1999 Pan American Games